Amsterdam is an unincorporated community located within Holland Township in Hunterdon County, New Jersey. Located on the southern flank of the Musconetcong Mountain, the area was settled in the first half of the 18th century. It was later named after Amsterdam, Netherlands. The Amsterdam Historic District, encompassing the community, was listed on the state and national registers of historic places in 1995.

History
By 1881, Amsterdam had a saw mill, carpenter shop, and shoe shop.

The former Belvidere Delaware Railroad, which was built along the Delaware River in the 1850s, bypassed Amsterdam.

Historic district

The Amsterdam Historic District is a  historic district encompassing the community along Amsterdam, Church, and Crab Apple Hill roads. It was added to the National Register of Historic Places on March 17, 1995 for its significance in architecture and community development. The district includes 30 contributing buildings.

The farmhouse at 5 Amsterdam Road was built  and shows Greek Revival influences. The farmhouse at 21 Amsterdam Road was built  and features Queen Anne embellishment. The bank barns for both of these farms are contributing to the district. The farmhouse at 33 Amsterdam Road was built  with Gothic Revival influences.

See also
 National Register of Historic Places listings in Hunterdon County, New Jersey

References

External links
 
 

Holland Township, New Jersey
Unincorporated communities in Hunterdon County, New Jersey
Unincorporated communities in New Jersey